Elk Township is a township in Cloud County, Kansas, USA.  As of the 2000 census, its population was 845.

Geography
According to the USGS, it contains two cemeteries: Mount Calvary and Mount Hope.

The streams of Elk Creek and West Fork Elk Creek run through this township.

References
 USGS Geographic Names Information System (GNIS)

External links
 US-Counties.com
 City-Data.com

Townships in Cloud County, Kansas
Townships in Kansas